YDN may refer to:

 Yale Daily News, published by Yale University students in New Haven, Connecticut
 Dauphin (Lt. Col W.G. (Billy) Barker VC Airport), the IATA airport code
 Yahoo! Developer Network
 Ysgol Dyffryn Nantlle, a secondary school in North Wales.